Founded as the first Moravian settlement in Wachovia on November 17, 1753, Bethabara served until 1766 as the center of Moravian work in the South.  The old historic church was built in 1788.Designed by Moravian administrator Friedrich Wilhelm von Marschall, it is listed on the National Register of Historic Places. Bethabara Moravian Church facility was built in 1788 in what is now Winston-Salem, North Carolina.

It was listed on the National Register of Historic Places in 1971. The Bethabara Historic District, including the Church, were declared a National Historic Landmark in 1999.

The church is located at 2147 Bethabara Road.  The congregation is still active, and meets down the road in an updated building at 2100 Bethabara Road, at the intersection with Indiana Avenue.

References

External links

Historic American Buildings Survey in North Carolina
Churches on the National Register of Historic Places in North Carolina
Churches in Winston-Salem, North Carolina
Moravian churches in North Carolina
Churches completed in 1788
National Register of Historic Places in Winston-Salem, North Carolina
1788 establishments in North Carolina
18th-century churches in the United States